Larry Sullivan is a former American collegiate head men's soccer coach. From 1991 to 2007, he served as the head men's soccer coach at Villanova University. In 17 years, he compiled a 104–155–28 losing record. Prior to that from 1983 to 1991, he served as the head men's soccer coach at Father Judge High School. He started his coaching career in 1978 at St. Joseph's University. He was also the head coach of the Camden Catholic High School varsity boys soccer team in Cherry Hill, NJ.

He was a three-year varsity letter winner at Northeast Catholic High School where he played both baseball and soccer. He was voted All-Catholic twice and was part of three PCL championship teams. After high school, he joined the United States Army, and served in Vietnam. He received a Purple Heart, two Bronze Stars of medal, and the Army Accommodation Award of valor.  Sullivan then played College soccer at Temple U. from 1970 to 1972.  Sullivan then played for the Philadelphia Spartans Professional Soccer Team.  Larry Sullivan has been inducted to the North Catholic Alumni, the North Catholic Soccer, the Father Judge, and SEPA Halls of Fame.

Personal life
Sullivan is the grandfather of Philadelphia Union player Quinn Sullivan and the uncle of former player Chris Albright.

References

Villanova Wildcats men's soccer coaches
Living people
Year of birth missing (living people)
Sportspeople from Philadelphia
Temple Owls men's soccer players
Saint Joseph's Hawks men's soccer coaches
Association football midfielders
American soccer coaches
Soccer players from Philadelphia
Association football players not categorized by nationality